Petra Mattheis (born 1967 in Moers) is a German Artist und Photographer. She became known for her artistic engagement with the topic menstruation.

Biography 
Mattheis studied communications design at the University of Applied Sciences Wiesbaden and graduated in 1994 with a diploma. She studied Fine Arts at the Akademie für Bildende Künste Mainz from 2002 to 2006 and finished with a diploma as well. From 2007 bis 2009 she was a student in the master class of Joachim Blank at the Hochschule für Grafik und Buchkunst Leipzig.

Works 
With her website Become A Menstruator as well as with installations and prints, Mattheis investigates menstruation in an artistic, playful approach, questions cultural-historical developments and today's way of dealing with one's own body in our society.
Each motif of the blood-red prints in her series BAM – Become a Menstruator corresponds to a fertile year in the life of the artist. While each print is a handmaid original, the size of the edition corresponds with the sum of the periods she had during this year. Thus, Mattheis not only addresses a taboo, her works also receive an autobiographical character.

Solo exhibitions 
2006: Überwiegend Schwarz auf Weiß, Nassauischer Kunstverein Wiesbaden
 2009: Pulsierender Pfirsich, Kuhturm, Leipzig
 2011: Hinter den Worten, Gallery Queen Anne, Tapetenwerk, Leipzig
 2015: Arts and Crafts Week at Panty Camp, Gallery The Grass is Greener, Leipzig
 2017: Riding the Red Tide, Museum der bildenden Künste, Leipzig
 2018: Become a Menstruator Booth, Museum der bildenden Künste, Leipzig
 2019: Shark Weeks, Atelierfrankfurt, Frankfurt

Selected group exhibitions 
2004: Zwischen, Nassauischer Kunstverein Wiesbaden, with Ilka Meyer
 2011: East of Fresno, group exhibition for contemporary art, The Hatchery Art Space, Badger, California
 2012: Schläft ein Lied in allen Dingen, Bellevuesaal with Klaus Lomnitzer, Wiesbaden

Awards and scholarships 
 2016: Projektstipendium des Landes Rheinland-Pfalz

Publications 
 Nassauischer Kunstverein e.V.: Petra Mattheis und Ilka Meyer. Catalog of the exhibition Zwischen – Petra Mattheis, Ilka Meyer, 9 May to 13 June and 29 June to 11 July 2004; Part of the exhibition series Perspektiven der Zukunft. With contributions by Christian Rabanus, Botho Strauß and Ilka Meyer. NKV, Wiesbaden 2004

References

External links 
 Official Website of Petra Mattheis
 Project Become A Menstruator
 Project Wunderwesten

1967 births
Living people
German women artists
20th-century German artists
21st-century German artists
Feminist artists
Artists from Leipzig
German contemporary artists
Hochschule für Grafik und Buchkunst Leipzig alumni
20th-century German women
21st-century German women